Stacey's Gym is an Australian television drama which first screened on the ABC in 1974.

Cast
 Patricia Smith
 John Clayton
 Tony Allison

External links
Stacey's Gym at Classic Australian TV
Stacey's Gym at IMDb

Australian Broadcasting Corporation original programming
1973 Australian television series debuts
Australian drama television series
English-language television shows